Víctor Muñoz (born 1957) is a Spanish former footballer.

Victor Muñoz may also refer to:
Victor Muñoz (biochemist), Spanish scientist
Victor Muñoz (footballer, born 1990), Spanish former footballer